Elena Linari (born 15 April 1994) is an Italian professional footballer who plays as a centre back for Serie A club AS Roma and the Italy women's national team. She has also played for FC Girondins de Bordeaux, Atlético Madrid, Fiorentina and Brescia, and she has won four league titles, four cups and two supercups. She has represented Italy internationally since 2013.

On 14 January 2021, she joined AS Roma on a free transfer and signed a contract until June 2021.

Club career 
Linari started her youth career with Atletica Castello and played in inter-gender training matches until she moved to Claudio Desolati's football academy in Florence when Linari was fourteen years old. She then played for her region's football club Firenze for five seasons, beginning in the 2008-2009 season and making her Serie A debut at sixteen years of age with the club. Linari would also win a Primavera title with Firenze in the 2012-2013 season.

The Italian defender would make a total 107 appearances for Firenze until Linari moved to Brescia in the summer of 2013. She won more team titles with Brescia, including winning the Serie A league title in her first season with the club. Linari also made her UEFA Champions League debut with Brescia on 9 October 2014. She would later with the Coppa Italia in 2014-15, and win two Supercoppa trophies in 2014 and 2015. In the summer of 2016, Linari decided to return to her home region and play for Fiorentina, which is the club she has supported since she was a child.

Linari would go on to win a league title and two Coppa Italia trophies during her two seasons playing for Fiorentina, before she chose to become the first female Italian football player to sign a professional contract when she signed with Atlético Madrid in the summer of 2018.

During her two-year stay in Spain, Linari won a Liga title and made the cup final with Atletico before moving to France to sign with Bordeaux in 2020. Her brief stay with Bordeaux was not successful, and Linari the offer to return to her native Italy and play with Roma from January 2021 onwards.

During Linari's first six months of playing for Roma, the team's goal-concession rate dropped from 1.21 goals conceded per game to 0.88 goals conceded per game. Linari's arrival is widely credited with re-installing Roma's belief in their long-term goals as well as helping lead Roma to the club's first major trophy in the women's side of the game.

On 30 May 2021, the Italian defender racked up 16 ball recoveries, completed 111 passes and won 5 aerial duels for Roma in their 2021 Coppa Italia final victory over AC Milan. That victory resulted in the fourth Coppa Italia winner's medal won by Linari in her playing career.

Career statistics

International goals

References

External links

 

1994 births
Living people
Italian women's footballers
Italy women's international footballers
Serie A (women's football) players
A.S. Roma (women) players
Women's association football defenders
A.C.F. Brescia Calcio Femminile players
Fiorentina Women's F.C. players
Italian expatriate sportspeople in Spain
2019 FIFA Women's World Cup players
Atlético Madrid Femenino players
Primera División (women) players
LGBT association football players
Italian LGBT sportspeople
Lesbian sportswomen
Italian expatriate sportspeople in France
Italian expatriate women's footballers
Expatriate women's footballers in Spain
Expatriate women's footballers in France
ACF Firenze players
FC Girondins de Bordeaux (women) players
Sportspeople from the Metropolitan City of Florence
Footballers from Tuscany
UEFA Women's Euro 2022 players
UEFA Women's Euro 2017 players